John Ryan VC (1839 – 29 December 1863) was a British Army soldier and an Irish recipient of the Victoria Cross, the highest award for gallantry in the face of the enemy that can be awarded to British and Commonwealth forces.

Early life
Ryan was born in Borrisoleigh, County Tipperary in 1839.

Victoria Cross
Ryan was about 24 years old, and a lance corporal in the 65th Regiment of Foot (later the 1st Battalion, York and Lancaster Regiment),  during the Invasion of Waikato (one of the campaigns in the New Zealand Wars), when the following deed took place on 7 September 1863, for which he was awarded the VC.

Ryan died at Tuakau, New Zealand, on 29 December 1863, before he received the medal. He drowned while trying to save a drunken comrade in the Waikato River.

The medal
His Victoria Cross is displayed at The York & Lancaster Regiment Museum (Rotherham, South Yorkshire, England).

References

Irish recipients of the Victoria Cross
York and Lancaster Regiment soldiers
1839 births
1863 deaths
19th-century Irish people
Irish soldiers in the British Army
People from County Tipperary
British military personnel of the New Zealand Wars
New Zealand Wars recipients of the Victoria Cross
Deaths by drowning in New Zealand
Accidental deaths in New Zealand
British Army recipients of the Victoria Cross
Military personnel from County Tipperary